Alfred Gilpin Jones,  (September 28, 1824 – March 15, 1906) was a Canadian businessman, politician, and eighth Lieutenant Governor of Nova Scotia.

Biography 
Born in Weymouth, Nova Scotia, the son of Guy Carleton Jones and Frances Jones, he was a merchant and established his own firm, A. G. Jones and Company, in 1872.

In 1867, he was elected to the House of Commons of Canada for the riding of Halifax. One of 18 members elected of the Anti-Confederation Party, he became an independent in 1869 and was defeated in 1872. He was re-elected in 1874 but was forced to resign in 1878 due to an alleged breach of the Independence of Parliament Act. He was re-elected in the resulting 1878 by-election and was appointed Minister of Militia and Defence from January to October. He was defeated in the 1878 election and in 1882. He was re-elected in 1887 as a Liberal but was defeated in 1891.
From 1900 until his death in Halifax in 1906, he was the Lieutenant-Governor of Nova Scotia.

Family

Jones was married twice: to Margaret Wiseman Stairs, the aunt of John Fitzwilliam Stairs, in 1850 and to Emma Albro in 1877. Jones and his first wife, Margaret Wiseman had a daughter Alice, who was a writer known under her nom de plume Alix John. Alice Jones was born and educated in Halifax, Nova Scotia, and studied languages in France and Italy. She wrote for the Toronto Week, and contributed a serial, "A Hazard of Hearts," to Frank Leslie's Monthly. She published a novel "The Night Hawk" in 1902 and "Bubbles We Buy" in 1903.

Electoral history

References

1824 births
1906 deaths
Anti-Confederation Party MPs
Canadian people of Welsh descent
Independent MPs in the Canadian House of Commons
Lieutenant Governors of Nova Scotia
Liberal Party of Canada MPs
Members of the House of Commons of Canada from Nova Scotia
Members of the King's Privy Council for Canada
People from Digby County, Nova Scotia
Canadian Militia officers